The Tots and Quots was a dining club for scientists and other intellectuals that was based in London and was active from 1931 to 1946. It was founded by Solly Zuckerman and went through two periods of activity, one from 1931 to 1933, and a second period when Zuckerman revived the club in November 1939. Most of the activity of the second period took place between 1940 and 1943, but it was not disbanded until 1946 when increasing political divergence and limitations on Zuckerman's time made the organisation no longer viable.

The name "Tots and Quots" was chosen as an abbreviation of the latin phrase "Quot homines, tot sententiae" ('there are as many opinions as there are people', or literally 'as many men, so many opinions'), with the words tot and quot being inadvertently placed in the wrong order.

Notable members 

 J. D. Bernal
 Richard Crossman
 James Crowther
 Solly Zuckerman, Baron Zuckerman

References

1931 establishments in England
1946 disestablishments in England
Scientific organizations established in 1931
Dining clubs